Himacerus boops  is a species of damsel bug in the family Nabidae. They are not present in most parts of the Mediterranean.

Many different habitats without vegetation are inhabited by this species. They occur in wet meadows and even in dry, warm, sandy habitats with barren vegetation, on moorland or on grassland and also in habitats influenced by salt near the coast or inland.

Both the nymphs and the imagines of Himacerus boops live on the ground and rarely climb on grass. They are mainly nocturnal. Overwintering occurs as the egg. They are inserted by the females in blades of grass. The nymphs occur from May until the end of July, the adult from early July ( under favourable conditions from mid-June).Pairing can be seen until well into the autumn and individual have been found in November.

References

External links
British Bugs

Nabidae
Insects described in 1870
Taxa named by Jørgen Matthias Christian Schiødte